Donggala Regency is a regency in the Central Sulawesi Province of Indonesia. It lies between 0° 30" north and 2°20" south latitude, and between 119° 45°" and 121° 45" east longitude, and covers a land area of 5,275.69 km2. It had a population of 277,236 at the 2010 Census and 300,436 at the 2020 Census; the official estimate as at mid 2021 was 302,965. The administrative capital of Donggala Regency is the town of Banawa, located a 30-minute drive (34 km) northwest from the city of Palu, the capital of the province.

History 

Before the Dutch assumed administration in 1904 under Governor-General J. B. van Heutsz, the Central Sulawesi area was the home of eight small kingdoms (kerajaan): Palu, Sigi Dolo, Kulawi, Biromaru, Banawa, Tawaili, Parigi, and Moutong.

In September 2018, Donggala and Palu City suffered heavy casualties due to a tsunami.

Administrative Districts 
The Dongala Regency is divided at 2010 into sixteen districts (kecamatan). These are physically divided into two sections, lying to the west and to the east of the Palu River Valley respectively, and separated from each other by Palu city and the Sigi Regency. The first (southern) section comprises five districts, of which the northern Banawa and Banawa Tengah (together known as Donggala town) were the areas grievously inundated by the 2018 earthquake and tsunami. The second (northern) section comprises eleven districts, stretching south to north along the west coast of Sulawesi's northern peninsula. The districts comprise 167 administrative villages (rural desa and urban kelurahan).

These districts are tabulated below with their areas and their populations at the 2010 Census and 2020 Census, together with the official estimates of population as at mid 2021. The table also includes the number of administrative villages in each district, and its postal codes.

Notes: (a) including 2 offshore islands. (b) including 2 offshore islands. (c) including 17 offshore islands. (d) including 3 offshore islands. (e) including 6 offshore islands.

2013
Most of the districts of Donggala Regency, together with Palu city and some of the districts of Sigi Regency, were covered in the Rencana Pembangunan Jangka Panjang (Long-Term Development Plan) as of 2013. In all, the area of the Plan covered twenty-one districts.

Tourist attractions

 Tanjung Karang Beach, Donggala, Labuan Bajo,  Banawa 
Pusentasi (pusat Laut), Towale 
 Boneoge Beach, Banawa 
 Anjungan Gonenggati, Banawa 
 Kabonga Beach, Banawa 
 Art & Culture, Home Industry, Sarong Donggala, Salubomba village, Limboro,Watusampu, Kola-Kola,  Ganti, Kabonga, Loli, Wani 
 Gonenggati Mangrove Forest, Kabonga Besar, Banawa 
 Enu Beach, Enu 
 Bambarano Beach
 Kalukku Beach, Limboro
 Hayalan Beach, Salubomba 
 Lembasada Beach, Lembasada 
 Surumana Beach, Surumana 
 Tosale Beach, Tosale 
 Batusuya Beach, Batusuya 
 Salur Beach, Sioyong, Sabang 
 Taipa Beach, Taipa 
 Parimpi Indah Beach, Lende, Sirenja
 Saget Beach and LendeNtovea, Sojol Utara 
 Majang Beach, Long Village, Damsol 
 Sivalenta Beach Sirenja 
 Salumbone Beach, Salumbone 
 Labuana Beach, Lende Ntovea, Sirenja 
 Lake Talaga
 Lake Dampelas
 Rano Lake 
 Lino Lake, Lino 
 Talaga Lake, Dampelas 
 Kaledo (soup)
 Bambahano, Sabang 
 Pasoso Island, Balaesang 
 Maputi Island, Pangalaseang 
 Taring Island, Lenju, Sojol Utara 
 Loli Tasiburi Waterfall 
 Powelua Waterfall, Banawa Tengah 
 Walandanu Waterfall, Balaesang 
 Bou Waterfall, Bou, Damsol 
 Nupabomba Waterfall, Nupabomba 
 Bale Waterfall, Bale, Tanantovea
 Ogoamas Waterfall, Sojol Utara  
 Hotspring, Tambu Village 
 Camping Ground Nupabomba, Nupabomba 
 Pemandian Loli Indah, Loli Oge, Banawa
 Nature Reserve Sojol Mountain, Sojol

References 

Regencies of Central Sulawesi